Sara Ines Joya Lobaton (born 22 February 1976) is a volleyball player from Peru, who plays as a middle-blocker. She represented her country at the 1996 Summer Olympics in Atlanta, Georgia.

Career
She played in the 1996 Olympic Games finishing in the 11th place. In the 1999 FIVB World Cup she ranked 10th and 20th in the 2006 World Championship. She was 11th in the 2007 FIVB World Cup and was seventh in both 2007 Pan-American Cup and 2008 Pan-American Cup.

References

External links
 
 

1976 births
Living people
Peruvian women's volleyball players
Volleyball players at the 1996 Summer Olympics
Olympic volleyball players of Peru
Volleyball players at the 2007 Pan American Games
Pan American Games competitors for Peru
Place of birth missing (living people)
20th-century Peruvian women
21st-century Peruvian women